Shaun Cassidy is the first solo album from Shaun Cassidy. The eponymous album was first released in 1976 in Europe and Australia, where he had top-ten hits with "Morning Girl" and "That's Rock 'n' Roll". It was not until the release of a cover version of The Crystals' song, "Da Doo Ron Ron", that Cassidy's international success carried over into the United States.  The single became a number-one Billboard hit for Cassidy and launched his career as a pop musician and teen idol in the U.S.

"That's Rock 'n' Roll" was written by Eric Carmen. It was the follow-up single to "Da Doo Ron Ron" in the U.S. and peaked at number three.

Track listing
"Da Doo Ron Ron" (Phil Spector, Jeff Barry, Ellie Greenwich)
"Morning Girl" (Tupper Saussy)
"I Wanna Be with You" (Michael Lloyd)
"It's Too Late" (Bobby Goldsboro)
"Hey There Lonely Girl" (Earl Shuman, Leon Carr)
"That's Rock 'n' Roll" (Eric Carmen)
"Holiday" (Shaun Cassidy)
"Take Good Care of My Baby" (Gerry Goffin, Carole King)
"Amblin'" (Michael Lloyd)
"Be My Baby" (Phil Spector, Jeff Barry, Ellie Greenwich)

Personnel
Shaun Cassidy - vocals, keyboards
Jay Graydon, Mitch Holder, Michael Lloyd - guitar
Dee Murray, Mike Porcaro - bass
Greg Mathieson, Jay Gruska - keyboards
Carlos Vega, Rick Shlosser - drums
Alan Estes - percussion
John D'Andrea - saxophone, brass arrangement
John Rosenberg - director of horns
Sid Sharp - director of strings
Gene Morford, Jimmy Haas, Jon Joyce, Michael Lloyd, Michelle Gruska, Ron Hicklin, Shaun Cassidy, Tom Bahler - background vocals
Humberto Gatica - engineer

Charts

Weekly charts

Year-end charts

Certifications

References

Shaun Cassidy albums
1977 debut albums
Warner Records albums
Albums produced by Michael Lloyd (music producer)